The FIL World Luge Championships 1965 took place in Davos, Switzerland. This is the second time the city has hosted the event, having done so in 1957.

Men's singles

Women's singles

Doubles

The East German doubles sweep at these championships would lead the International Luge Federation (FIL) to limit a country's doubles team to a maximum of two teams.

Medal table

References
Men's doubles World Champions
Men's singles World Champions
Women's singles World Champions

FIL World Luge Championships
1965 in luge
Sport in Davos
1965 in Swiss sport
Luge in Switzerland